Emily Christine Keener (born November 23, 1998) is an American singer and songwriter. She started performing solo shows when she was 12. She became a contestant on season 10 of NBC's The Voice, in 2016 at the age of 16. She advanced to the Top 12 before being eliminated.

Life and career 
Keener was born in Cleveland, Ohio and later moved to Avon Lake, Ohio in 2004, and finally moved to a 37-acre farm in Wakeman, Ohio in 2007, at eight years old. Keener taught herself to play guitar when she was around the age of ten. At eleven, she was writing songs, and by age twelve she was playing at area wineries and restaurants. Her father has greatly influenced her preferences for music, exposing her to a variety of styles and genres. Keener has stated that she struggles with depression, and that writing music provides an outlet for her to cope.

In 2013, Keener released an album, A Book of New Beginnings, through iTunes,. On June 11, 2016, Keener released a single titled "Elevator" through Bandcamp., which was later included on her album Breakfast, released November 18, 2016.

On May 22, 2020, Keener independently released her sophomore album, I Do Not Have To Be Good.

The Voice
Keener auditioned for season 10 of The Voice, and turned the chairs of all four coaches. She chose Pharrell Williams as her coach. She won her battle against Jonathan Bach, which aired on March 21, 2016 with the song "Explosions." Her knockout against Shalyah Fearing aired on March 28, 2016; she won her knockout and advanced to the Live Playoffs. Williams used his coach save in the Playoffs to advance Keener to the Top 12, where she was eliminated.

References

External links
 

Musicians from Cleveland
The Voice (franchise) contestants
1998 births
Living people
People from Lorain County, Ohio
People from Wakeman, Ohio
Singer-songwriters from Ohio